Sergei Gennadyevich Troitskiy (born 14 February 1961) is a former Russian professional footballer.

Club career
He made his professional debut in the Soviet Second League in 1981 for FC Dynamo Bryansk.

Honours
 Soviet Cup winner: 1986.

References

1961 births
Sportspeople from Bryansk
Living people
Soviet footballers
Association football defenders
Russian footballers
FC Torpedo Moscow players
FC Kuban Krasnodar players
FC Kremin Kremenchuk players
Russian Premier League players
Ukrainian Premier League players
Russian expatriate footballers
Expatriate footballers in Ukraine
Russian football managers
FC Dynamo Bryansk players